The 1999 Nigerian Senate election in Sokoto State was held on February 20, 1999, to elect members of the Nigerian Senate to represent Sokoto State. Aliyu Abubakar representing Sokoto North, Bello Jibrin Gada representing Sokoto East and Abdallah Wali representing Sokoto South all won on the platform of the All Nigeria Peoples Party.

Overview

Summary

Results

Sokoto North 
The election was won by Aliyu Abubakar of the All Nigeria Peoples Party.

Sokoto East 
The election was won by Bello Jibrin Gada of the All Nigeria Peoples Party.

Sokoto South 
The election was won by Abdallah Wali of the All Nigeria Peoples Party.

References 

February 1999 events in Nigeria
Sok
Sokoto State Senate elections